Hendecourt-lès-Ransart (literally Hendecourt near Ransart) is a commune in the Pas-de-Calais department in the Hauts-de-France region of France.

Geography

History
The etymology of the name begins as ‘’’Hetnanicurtis’’, the small area (curtis) belonging to someone by the name of Hetna, in the Merovingian time. The name has changed over the years: Hendecourdelle (1300); Hendecourdel (1300, 1380, 1450, 1457, 1552, 1556, 1574, 1578); Hendecordel (1338, 1400); Hennecourt (1500); Hendecorde (1565); Hennnecordel (1723); Hendecourt (1804); Hendecourt-Lez-Ransart in the 19th century and finally Hendecourt-Les-Ransart.  
The first chateau was probably built around 1703 by Louis-Joseph Le Sergeant of Hendecourt on the site of an earlier manor house. The chateau and its farm were sold in 1878 to the Diesbach de Belleroche family from Fribourg Switzerland, who still own it today. The entire village and chateau were completely destroyed between 1914-1918 then rebuilt.
The old flour mill was dismantled in 1912.

Population

Places of interest
 The church of Notre-Dame, rebuilt along with the rest of the village, after World War I.
 The chateau.

See also
Communes of the Pas-de-Calais department

References

Hendecourtlesransart